George Wurtz Hughes (September 30, 1806 – September 3, 1870) was a U.S. Representative from the 6th Congressional district of Maryland.

Born in Elmira, New York, Hughes received a liberal schooling. He attended the United States Military Academy at West Point from 1823 to 1827, but failed to graduate and became a civil engineer in New York City. He was appointed to the United States Army on July 7, 1838, as captain of Topographical Engineers, and served in the Mexican–American War. He was promoted to lieutenant colonel of Maryland and District of Columbia Volunteers on August 4, 1847, and to colonel on October 1, 1847. He was honorably mustered out of the volunteer service on July 24, 1848, and commissioned lieutenant colonel on May 30, 1848, resigning on August 4, 1851.

Hughes became president of the Northern Central Railway, and was later elected as a Democrat to the Thirty-sixth Congress from the 6th Congressional district of Maryland, serving one term from March 4, 1859, to March 3, 1861. He worked as a consulting engineer and planter at West River, Maryland until his death there. The son in law of Virgil Maxcy, he is interred in the family burying ground of the Galloway and Maxcy families, Tulip Hill, at West River.

References

1806 births
1870 deaths
19th-century American politicians
American planters
Democratic Party members of the United States House of Representatives from Maryland
People from Anne Arundel County, Maryland
Politicians from Elmira, New York
United States Army officers
United States Military Academy alumni